The AIM at Melanoma Foundation (AIM) is a nonprofit organization focused on melanoma research.

AIM was created as a collaboration between the Charlie Guild Foundation and James A. Schlipmann Melanoma Cancer Foundation.

References

External links
 

Cancer organizations based in the United States
Dermatology organizations
Articles containing video clips
Medical and health organizations based in Texas